Trechistus is a genus of beetles in the family Carabidae, containing the following species:

 Trechistus gordoni Eberhard & Giachino, 2011
 Trechistus humicola Moore, 1972
 Trechistus inconspicuus Moore, 1972
 Trechistus stenoderus Moore, 1972
 Trechistus sylvaticus Moore, 1972
 Trechistus terricola Moore, 1972

References

Trechinae